Katell Gélébart is a French ecodesigner, artist, activist, educator and entrepreneur.  She is best known for her fashion designs made from re-purposing unwanted materials.

Biography
Gélébart was born in Brest, France. She graduated from La Sorbonne University in 1996 with a Master of Scandinavian Studies. She also attended the École du Louvre. In her 20s she was an environmental campaigner, in the fields of nuclear issues, tropical wood, trade of endangered species etc. working for diverse grass roots organisations in Europe.  In 1998, in Amsterdam, she founded ART D’ECO & DESIGN, her company specializing in fashion and other products  made from refashioning and reusing wastes.

Gélébart currently teaches the module Men/Environment at NABA  (the New Academy of Fine Arts) in Milan, Italy.

Creations
Since 2004, Gélébart has been developing entire collections of garments and fashion accessories out of unwanted materials. Her media of work have expanded to include stationery collection and interior design.

She lectures in design academies around the world. She empowers people and craft people (specially in India) to create with their own waste.

She has had shows in many galleries around the world. Her major show was a retrospective : WAS DAT IS  at the Museum für Kunst & Gewerbe, in Germany.

Awards and presentations
In 2013, her biography in German " Die Mülldesignerin: wie Katell Gélébart die Welt verändert" has been published by SCORPIO and written by Christine Eichel.

In 2018, she published in English her autobiography  The Freedom of Having Nothing, Ecodesigner and Global Nomad by Amazon.

In 2012, she was the recipient of the Kairos Prize, the European Cultural award by the A. Toepfer foundation (Hamburg). When receiving the award, she said of her work; "My work philosophy and ethic is to develop the potential of recycling/re-using of waste & unwanted materials in the field of design. My creations show that it is possible to combine design and re-use without creating raw material and generating more waste as a result of this process. My work is the embodiment of "ecodesign" : the art of re-using  and utilizing low tech’ means only.  Via my company ART D’ECO & DESIGN, I implement my vision and inspire people to do alike"

References

External links
Official Website of Katell Gélébart
 An account of her work is "The Trash Designer" Published by Scorpio written by Christine Eichel
 TEDxHamburg Talk on How to make Handbags from Trash
 Der Spiegel:  Creative Recycling: The Beauty and the Trash

1972 births
Living people
21st-century French women artists
French businesspeople
French activists
French women activists
French educators
French fashion designers
Paris-Sorbonne University alumni
Artists from Brest, France
French women fashion designers